Muhammad Ahmed Bashir (born 1 December 1949) is a Pakistani hurdler. He competed in the men's 110 metres hurdles at the 1972 Summer Olympics.

References

1949 births
Living people
Athletes (track and field) at the 1972 Summer Olympics
Pakistani male hurdlers
Olympic athletes of Pakistan
Place of birth missing (living people)